Knorkator is a German band from Berlin that combines heavy metal with comical elements. They proclaim themselves to be "Germany's  band in the world", as the title "The best band in the world" was already taken by Die Ärzte. The band was founded in 1994, but only played in the Berlin/Brandenburg area until 1998.

After the qualification show, German tabloid BILD notoriously headlined "" ("Who let these lunatics on TV?").

Knorkator announced the end of the band in a MySpace bulletin on 14 June 2008, the last concert was played on 5 December that year in Berlin. The official reason given for the band's breakup was that Alf Ator wanted to leave Germany to start a new life in Thailand. In autumn 2010 a bulletin by Stumpen announced the bands' reunion. A first "small" tour followed in April 2011 as well as some concerts at well-known festivals like Wacken Open Air. The tour was called the "77 minutes tour", as the setlist was planned to be exactly 77 minutes long. A digital clock that counted down the minutes was placed on stage to make sure the time limit was not exceeded. Their new album  (translates to "Let there be Not" or "Let Not Be", a pun on  - "Let there be Light") was in September 2011, followed by a big tour with concerts of regular length.

Style 
Knorkator's music can be largely classified as industrial metal, somewhat akin to White Zombie and Ministry. Knorkator, however, strongly features a comedic element. Most songs escalate into falsetto vocals and bombastic, over-the-top anthemic choruses, with crushing guitars and subtle samplers. Due to the amusing message, however, the band's considerable technical and artistic merit is sometimes overlooked.

Knorkator's lyrics are somewhat explicit, but always very humorous. Most of the band's lyrics are in German; however, some songs also feature English ("beating around the bush", "Ma Baker", etc.), Thai, Latin, or French lyrics. Their famous song  ("We're all going to die") has also been translated into the Arabic language.
The songs in English are often extreme covers of previously well-known hit songs.

The song  is featured as a music video in the 3rd episode of Adult Swim's Off the Air (2011).

Live performances 
Knorkator's wild stage shows and appearance are chaotic: half of Stumpen's body is tattooed black, and he usually performs in his goofy underpants; Buzz Dee's appearance is often cited as being a clone of Big Jim Martin.

Knorkator are (in)famous for their wild stage shows. Alf Ator has been known to hit the audience with a large foam club, throw toast slices and wet autumn foliage at the crowd. Sometimes a modified shredder was used to distribute shredded vegetables and fruit over the crowd, which was announced as "vegetarian airway-catering". Their live performances are also well known for extensive acts of instrument destruction where especially keyboarder Alf Ator used to deconstruct one or more electronic organs that he had been playing on with a toilet brush or similar before. Singer Stumpen is known for the frequent smashing of TV sets on stage, from which he suffered a glass splinter getting stuck in his thigh that had to be removed by surgery some years later and was then auctioned on the internet. In earlier shows, a lot of furniture pieces were placed on the stage which were then destroyed during the show by Alf or Stumpen, mostly with an axe or a baseball bat. Stumpen is also known for wearing almost nothing on stage except for a woman's bathing suit or underpants.

Crowd surfing is another important element of Knorkator's shows, not only performed by the musicians themselves, but also directing the crowd to perform exceptional exercises, such as racing duels between spectators over the hands of the crowd, piggyback moshing, women throwing competitions, instructing the crowd to separate and then run into each other (known as the Wall of Death), or lifting and surfing the heavily overweight sound engineer from the mixing desk to the stage and back.

Members 
 Stumpen (Gero Ivers) – vocals
 Alf Ator (Alexander Thomas) – keyboards
 Buzz Dee (Sebastian Baur) – guitars (1996–present)
 Rajko Gohlke – bass (2010–present)
 Philipp Schwab – drums (2020–present)

Former members 
 J. Kirk Thiele – guitars (until 1997)
 Thomas Görsch – drums (until 1998)
 Chrish Chrash (Christian Gerlach) – drums (1998–2003)
 Tim Buktu (Tim Schallenberg) – bass (2003–2008)
 Sebhead Emm (Sebastian Meyer) – drums (2012–2014)
 Nick Aragua (Nicolaj Gogow) – drums (2003–2012, 2014–2020)

Touring members 
 Jen Majura – guitars (2012-2014)
 Philipp Schwab – drums (2014-2015)

Discography

CD 
 1998:  (The baddest of Knorkator)
 1999:  (pun with Hasenscharte (harelip) and chartbreaker)
 2000:  (Tribute to ourselves)
 2003:  (I hate music)
 2007:  (The next album of all time)
 2011:  (Let there be not)
 2014: 
 2016:  (I am the Boss)
 2019:  (Resistance [or: resistor] is futile)
 2022:  (Victory of reason)

CD (Live) 
 2005:  (Too old)
 2015:

CD (compilations) 
 2002:  (Heimatlieder – Songs of [our] home)
 2010:  (3 CD-Box Ltd. Ed.) (My life as a single)

DVD 
 2005:  (Too old)
 2007:  (Guest performance with 143.425 images,  bonus DVD)
 2008:  (The Way down)
 2011:  (Farewell Concert,  bonus DVD)
 2014:  (Citadel,  bonus DVD)
 2015: 
 2016:  ( bonus DVD)

Singles / EP 
 1995: 
 1998:  (Evil)
 1999:  (Way down)
 1999:  (Letter)
 2000:  (I turn into a pig)
 2000:  (I let myself be cloned)
 2000:  (Come back)
 2003:  (The ultimate man)
 2006:  (We will)
 2007:  (Old Man)
 2007:  (www.alovesong.com)
 2008:  (Children's Song)

controversy 

Knorkator were planning to go on tour in spring 2014 to present their new album , which was released on 17 January 2014. The album name is a pun, replacing "more" by the German word , which is a dated term for black people that today is only used in a historical or literary context. The tour was advertised with a poster showing the five (white) band members in a big pot on a fire and a black person with bones in their hair and a knife in their hand next to it. This is a reenactment of a scene in the 19th-century child's book . Knorkator singer Gero Ivers published a response in which he claims to be shocked and disappointed by the statement and argues that the intention of the poster had been misunderstood and not seen in context. Subsequently, the band stopped using the advertising poster but refused ISD's demand to change the album cover as they viewed the content of the reenacted scene as "profoundly anti-racist".

Bibliography

References

External links 

 Official site
 Alf Ator's site

German heavy metal musical groups
Musical groups established in 1994
Musical groups disestablished in 2008
Musical groups reestablished in 2011
Musical groups from Berlin
Musical quintets
Nuclear Blast artists
1994 establishments in Germany